Cheuk Mei Mei (1 January 1965 - 5 March 1994) was a Hong Kong national executed in Singapore for drug trafficking. Cheuk was the first woman convicted of a drug offence in Singapore to be executed.

Biography
Born in Hong Kong in 1965, Cheuk Mei Mei was working as a sales clerk at the time of her arrest.

Arrest at Changi Airport
On 28 February 1989, Cheuk and her accomplice Tse Po Chung flew into Changi Airport, Singapore from Phuket, arriving at 2:25pm, and were awaiting on a connecting flight to Amsterdam via Kuwait due to depart at 9:55pm that evening. Plainclothes customs officers on routine surveillance had observed them acting suspiciously in the transit lounge. Their behaviour caught the attention of three different officers, who watched them for more than one hour before approaching them. 

Cheuk and Tse both wore baggy denim jeans and appeared to be very nervous when questioned. The couple claimed they did not know one other, despite having being seen talking to each other several times. When searched, 24 individual plastic bags full of a whitish powder were discovered strapped to the thighs and lower legs of both of them. Using a Narcoban Test Kit, the customs officials determined the powder was heroin. 

On 2 March 1989, Cheuk and Tse were formally charged with importing heroin, worth an estimated $6 million, into Singapore. Tse was carrying 2,178 grammes and Cheuk was carrying 2,190.3 grammes.

Trial
On 6 January 1992, Deputy Public Prosecutor Jennifer Marie informed the court how customs officers on routine surveillance had spotted Cheuk and Tse disembarking from a Thai Airways flight and pulled them in for questioning. They subsequently found heroin strapped to their thighs and lower legs, as well as in their shoes. Cheuk had 2.18kg of heroin and Tse had 2.19kg of heroin in their possession respectively. 

On 7 January 1992, Cheuk testified in her defence that she thought she was smuggling gold jewellery into Singapore from Bangkok. She claimed a man who she was having an affair with named Fei Chai persuaded her to come with him to Bangkok, however he was then unable to travel. He pleaded with her to still go ahead, as his life would be in danger if the jewellery was not moved to Singapore. She met Tse, who she knew casually, at Kai Tak airport in Hong Kong, where they both flew out to Thailand together. They met 3 other men in Bangkok, who subsequently tied packages to her legs just before they boarded a flight to Singapore. Cheuk claimed she did not ask what they contained, as she was in a bad mood at the time. Tse remained silent when called to give his defence, though his lawyer Freddy Neo testified that Tse had previously declared in a written statement after his arrest that he had agreed to take "something" to Holland for a moneylender he owed HK$30,000 to.

On 13 January 1992, defence lawyers asserted that Cheuk and Tse did not know they were carrying drugs, hence they were not guilty of importation. Lawyer Freddy Neo also asserted that the act of importation was compete only once goods crossed the official customs barrier, therefore the pair could not have 'imported' the drugs as they both remained in the transit lounge. He further submitted that the act of importing must have the intention of delivering it to someone in Singapore.  

Deputy Public Prosecutor Jennifer Marie replied that recent court cases, such as the trial of Lau Chi Sing, had determined that 'import' meant bringing something into the country, whatever the purpose may be and regardless of whether Singapore was the ultimate destination or not, and regardless of whether it was delivered to anyone or not. She further argued that both accused must have known they were carrying drugs, as the heroin was wrapped in clear plastic cellophane bags and their contents could clearly be seen. They would also have had ample opportunity to examine the contents in the time it took to strap the packages to their legs.

Verdict
On 14 January 1992, Cheuk and Tse were both found guilty as charged and sentenced to death for importing 3.8 kilograms of heroin into Singapore, contrary to Section 7 of the 1975 Misuse of Drugs Act. Trail judges Justice S. Rajendran and Justice M.H. Rubin commented they did not accept their defence that they did not know they were carrying drugs, adding that when narcotics are brought anywhere into the geographical limits of Singapore, an offence of importing is committed under the provisions of the Misuse of Drugs Act.

Appeal
On 23 February 1993, the Appeals court dismissed their appeal and upheld their sentences. Rejecting their defence that they did not in fact import any drugs, as they were in transit and did not pass the official customs barrier, Justice Chao Hick Tin commented that Changi Airport transit lounge could theoretically be used as a centre for international drug trafficking if the word 'import' was used in the restricted sense contended by Cheuk and Tse. Conceding that 'import' could have a different technical meaning under different Acts (for example the Customs Act), Justice Chao Hick Tin asserted that there was no such ambiguity in the Misuse of Drugs Act, and import was defined therein as bringing any proscribed item into the territory of Singapore by land, sea or air.

Execution
Cheuk Mei Mei and Tse Po Chung were both hanged at Changi Prison on the morning of 5 March 1994.

Cheuk Mei Mei was the first female foreigner to be executed for a drug offence in Singapore.

See also 
 Capital punishment for drug trafficking
 Capital punishment in Singapore

References 

20th-century executions by Singapore
1965 births
1989 crimes in Singapore
1994 deaths
Hong Kong criminals
Hong Kong drug traffickers
Executed Hong Kong people
People executed for drug offences
Hong Kong people
People executed by hanging